Western is a station on the Chicago Transit Authority's 'L' system, serving the Orange Line. It is located between the neighborhoods of Brighton Park and Gage Park. The Orange Line crosses Western Avenue three times, however the station is located at its southernmost crossing at 49th Street.

Bus connections
CTA
  48 South Damen (weekday rush hours only) 
  49 Western (Owl Service) 
  X49 Western Express (weekday rush hours only) 
  94 California

Notes and references

Notes

References

External links 

Western Station Page CTA official site
Chicago "L".org Stations - Western/49th
Western Avenue entrance from Google Maps Street View

CTA Orange Line stations
Railway stations in the United States opened in 1993
Former Grand Trunk Western Railroad stations